The Virginia Squires were a basketball team based in Norfolk, Virginia, and playing in several other Virginia cities. They were members of the American Basketball Association from 1970 to 1976.

The team originated in 1967 as the Oakland Oaks, an ABA charter franchise based in Oakland, California. They moved to Washington, D.C. as the Washington Caps in 1969 but moved to Norfolk the following year, becoming the Squires. A regional team, they played home games in Richmond, Hampton, and Roanoke as well as Norfolk. The team folded in 1976, just a month before the ABA–NBA merger.

In Oakland 

The Squires were founded in 1967 as the Oakland Oaks, a charter member of the ABA.  The team colors were green and gold.  An earlier Oakland Oaks basketball team played in the American Basketball League (1961–62) in 1962. (The short-lived league folded on December 31, 1962.)

The Oaks were owned in part by pop singer Pat Boone. There was a major contract dispute with the cross-bay San Francisco Warriors of the established National Basketball Association over the rights to star player Rick Barry. He was a former NBA Rookie of the Year who had led the Warriors to the NBA finals in the same year the Oaks had formed, but due to being angered by management's failure to pay him certain incentive awards he felt he was due, he sat out the 1967–68 season, and the following season he joined the Oaks, leading the franchise to its one and only ABA championship in 1969.

However, even with Barry the team proved to be a very poor investment for Boone and his co-owners. Despite winning the ABA championship, the Oaks were an abysmal failure at the box office, due in large part to the proximity of the NBA Warriors who at the time were also playing some home games in Oakland (and would eventually move to Oakland in 1971). At one point they only drew 2,500 fans per game.

In Washington

Facing foreclosure on a loan from Bank of America, Boone sold the team to Washington, D.C. lawyer Earl Foreman, who moved the team to Washington for the 1969–70 season as the Washington Caps.  The team colors of green and gold were retained, but the logo was a red, white and blue rendition of the United States Capitol. They played at the Washington Coliseum. However, for reasons that remain unknown, they remained in the Western Division—forcing them on the longest road trips in the league. Attendance was no better in Washington than it was in Oakland. The Coliseum had been built in 1941, and had not aged well. Additionally, it was located in the North East Washington area, which was considered to be a bad neighborhood. They managed to finish four games above .500, but lost in the first round to the powerful Denver Rockets.

In Virginia
Merger talks with the NBA were already underway, but a major stumbling block was the presence of the Caps in Washington.  Baltimore Bullets owner Abe Pollin wanted to move his team to Washington, but did not want the Caps there.  The other ABA owners persuaded Foreman to move the Caps for the second time in as many seasons.  Foreman decided to make the Caps a regional franchise, the Virginia Squires.  The team would be based in Norfolk and played most of their games at the Norfolk Scope and the Old Dominion University Fieldhouse. They also played home games in Hampton at the Hampton Coliseum, in Richmond at the Richmond Coliseum and in Roanoke at the Roanoke Civic Center. However, Roanoke was dropped from the list of "home" cities after only one season. The Squires' colors were red, white, and blue.

Rick Barry, who originally played with the inaugural Oaks, appeared on the August 24, 1970 front cover of Sports Illustrated in a Squires uniform; in the accompanying article inside the magazine, Barry made several negative remarks about the Commonwealth of Virginia. (He angered Southerners by remarking that he did not want his children to grow up saying, "Hi, y'all, Dad.") On September 1, 1970, the Squires traded Barry to the New York Nets for a draft pick and $200,000.  While the negative comments had been a contributing factor to the trade, it primarily came because Foreman was still bogged down by financial troubles and had to sell Barry to help meet his expenses.

The Squires played most of their games at Old Dominion University's fieldhouse in their first season as a "regional" franchise, with other matches at the Richmond Arena, Hampton Coliseum (which was named Hampton Roads Coliseum at the time), and Roanoke Civic Center. In spite of the initial controversy surrounding Barry, the Squires finished their inaugural season in Virginia by winning the Eastern Division by 11 games. They defeated the Nets in the first round of the ABA playoffs but went on to be upset by the Kentucky Colonels.

In 1971, the Squires made their biggest draft pick ever by drafting Julius Erving from the University of Massachusetts Amherst. During the 1971–72 season, Erving became an instant sensation with his scoring prowess and dazzling on-court acrobatics; the Squires defeated The Floridians in the first round of the playoffs but lost to the New York Nets in the second round.

The 1972–73 season marked the beginning of the end for the Squires. Although blessed with a combination of Julius Erving ("Dr. J") and a young George Gervin, the duo only played together late in the season. The Squires lost to their division rival Kentucky in the first round of the playoffs. During the summer of 1973, Dr. J was traded along with Willie Sojourner to the Nets for George Carter and cash.

During the 1974 ABA All-Star Weekend, rumors abounded that Gervin was about to be sold to the San Antonio Spurs.  These rumors became fact on January 30, when the Squires sold Gervin to the Spurs for $225,000.  ABA commissioner Mike Storen tried to block the sale on the grounds that selling the team's last true star was not in the best interest of the league.  However, the sale was eventually upheld.

While the trades may have provided enough short-term financing to keep the Squires in business, the loss of so much talent angered the fans.  The Squires' attendance fell through the floor and never recovered.  The Squires' final two seasons in the ABA were forgettable as losses mounted and popular coach Al Bianchi was fired.  The 1974–75 and 1975–76 teams only won a total of 30 games, the worst winning percentages in ABA history.  The team was coming unraveled off the court as well.  In 1974, Barry Parkhill sued the team after his paychecks bounced.  The Squires nearly shut down for good in February 1976, but only managed to stay afloat by a sale of advertising banners and a $250,000 loan from a local bank.

As it turned out, this only bought the franchise three more months of life. On May 11, 1976 — only a month after the end of the season — the ABA canceled the franchise after it missed a $75,000 assessment. The Squires had no chance of being included in any merger. Regional franchises were not considered viable, and none of their home cities was anywhere near large enough to support an NBA team. Nevertheless, the Squires’ premature contraction cost them a chance to be compensated as part of the merger, which closed only a month later.

Basketball Hall of Famers

Season-by-season

|-
|colspan="6" align=center style="background:#CC0000; color:#FFFFFF; text-align:center; border:2px solid #0000CD;"| Virginia Squires
|-
|1970–71 || 55 || 29 || .655 || Won Division SemifinalsLost Division Finals || Virginia 4, New York 2Kentucky 4, Virginia 2
|-
|1971–72 || 45 || 39 || .536 || Won Division SemifinalsLost Division Finals || Virginia 4, Floridans 0New York 4, Virginia 3
|-
|1972–73 || 42 || 42 || .500 || Lost Division Semifinals || Kentucky 4, Virginia 1
|-
|1973–74 || 28 || 56 || .333 || Lost Division Semifinals || New York 4, Virginia 1
|-
|1974–75 || 15 || 69 || .179 || colspan=2|Did not qualify 
|-
|1975–76 || 15 || 68 || .181 || colspan=2|Did not qualify 
|-

Home venues

See also

Richmond Rhythm
Roanoke Dazzle

References

Pluto, Terry, Loose Balls: The Short, Wild Life of the American Basketball Association (Simon & Schuster, 1990), 
Pattison, Dan, Count Dracula Has Struck, Basketball Weekly, January 1976
Remember the ABA: Virginia Squires

External links
Virginia Squires Franchise Index at BasketballReference.com

 
1970 establishments in Virginia
1976 disestablishments in Virginia
American Basketball Association teams
Basketball teams in Virginia
Basketball teams established in 1970
Sports clubs disestablished in 1976
Sports in Hampton Roads
Sports in Norfolk, Virginia
Sports in Richmond, Virginia
Sports in Roanoke, Virginia
Defunct basketball teams in the United States